Charles Rojzman (August 23, 1942) is a French social psychologist, author and an international leader in mediating racial, ethnic and intercultural conflicts throughout the world. He is the creator of a method, Transformational Social Therapy (TST), which has been applied to resolving intergroup violence and conflicts in France, Rwanda, Chechnya, Israel and elsewhere. He has written dozens of books, articles and book chapters and has been featured in documentaries and writings by others.

Published works

 1999 Freud the Humanist 
 1999 How to Live Together : A New Way of Dealing with Racism and Violence with Sophie Pillods ; with a foreword by Sophie Bibrowska 
 2007 La Réconciliation, graphic novel with his daughter Théa Rojzman

External links

 Charles Rojzman Institute
 Multicultural Education and Training
 Voicing conflict | Charles Rojzman | TEDxVaugirardRoad 
 Transformational Social Therapy Symposium 2016 (Full Lecture in English) 

1942 births
20th-century French philosophers
French psychologists
Social psychologists
Social philosophers
Living people
Place of birth missing (living people)